Gibbovalva kobusi is a moth of the family Gracillariidae. It is known from China (Guizhou, Zhejiang, Hunan and Guangxi) and Japan (Hokkaidō and Honshū).

The wingspan is 6.5-9.2 mm.

The larvae feed on Magnolia kobus. They probably mine the leaves of their host plant.

References

Acrocercopinae
Moths of Japan
Moths described in 1988